Leadbetter Point is a point on the northwest coast of Pacific County in the state of Washington in the United States.  It lies at the southern side of the entrance to Willapa Bay.

It was named in 1852 by James Alden for fellow U.S. Coast Survey officer Danville Leadbetter.

See also
 Leadbetter Point State Park

References

Merriam-Webster's Geographical Dictionary, Third Edition. Springfield, Massachusetts: Merriam-Webster, Incorporated, 1997. .

Headlands of Washington (state)
Landforms of Pacific County, Washington